Petra Széles (born ) is a Hungarian female volleyball player, playing as a middle-blocker. She is part of the Hungary women's national volleyball team.

She competed at the 2015 Women's European Volleyball Championship. On club level she plays for Gödöllõ Clu.

References

External links

1988 births
Living people
Place of birth missing (living people)
Hungarian women's volleyball players